Proxi is an upcoming mobile game designed by video game designer Will Wright and developed by Gallium. It will be the first game created by Wright in over 10 years. The game was announced in a video at Unity's keynote talk at the Game Developers Conference in San Francisco on March 19, 2018. According to its official website, the game is "a simulation of an Artificial Intelligence based on your memories and interaction with the game". Players will be able to create and control the memories of their "proxi", an A.I.

In collaboration with the developer Gallium Studios and the game engine company Unity Technologies, Wright launched the Proxi Art Challenge, allowing artists to submit their work for the chance to be one of two winners flown to San Francisco and interviewed by Wright and the Proxi development team. The contest ended on May 14, 2018, and the grand prize winners, Rebecca Harrison and Pavel Novak, were chosen on May 29, 2018. Rebecca Harrison went on to become the team's artist in late 2018.

References

External links 
 Official website
 Proxi Art Challenge

Upcoming video games
Video games developed in the United States
Video games developed in the Czech Republic